Jimmy Smith or Jimmie Smith may refer to:

Music
 Jimmy Smith (musician) (1925–2005), American jazz organist
 Jimmy "Jammin'" Smith (1926–1953), American jazz trumpeter
 Jimmie Smith (born 1938), American jazz drummer
 Jimmy Smith, guitarist for English indie band Foals

Sports

American football
 Jimmy Smith (running back) (born 1960), American football player 
 Jimmy Smith (wide receiver) (born 1969), former NFL player with the Jacksonville Jaguars
 Jimmy Smith (cornerback) (born 1988), American football player for the Baltimore Ravens
 Jimmy Smith (American football coach), American college football coach
 Jimmy Smith (defensive back, born 1945), American football defensive back

Association football
 Jimmy Smith (footballer, born 1889) (c. 1889–1918), English centre forward who played for Brighton & Hove Albion and Bradford (Park Avenue)
 Jimmy Smith (footballer, born 1896) (1896–1945), Scottish footballer who played primarily for Aberdeen
 Jimmy Smith (footballer, born 1901) (1901–1964), Scottish goalkeeper
 Jimmy Smith (footballer, born 1902) (1902–1975), Scottish footballer who played for numerous clubs
 Jimmy Smith (Hearts footballer), Scottish footballer who played for several clubs, primarily Heart of Midlothian
 Jimmy Smith (footballer, born 1911) (1911–2003), Scottish footballer who played for Rangers
 Jimmy Smith (footballer, born 1930) (1930–2022), English footballer for Chelsea and Leyton Orient
 Jimmy Smith (footballer, born 1947), Scottish footballer who played for Newcastle United
 Jimmy Smith (footballer, born 1987), English footballer who played for Chelsea, Leyton Orient, Stevenage, Crawley Town and Yeovil Town

Other sports
 James Smith (boxer) (born 1953), American boxer, WBA world Heavyweight champion 1986-1987
 Jimmy Smith (Australian footballer) (1877–1948), Australian rules footballer and coach of St Kilda
 Jimmy Smith (1910s infielder) (1895–1974), Major League Baseball infielder who played from 1914 until 1922
 Jimmy Smith (basketball, born 1934) (1934–2002), American basketball player
 Jimmy Smith (fighter), American MMA commentator
 Jimmy Smith (1900s infielder) (1874–1960), Negro leagues infielder from 1902 to 1909
 Jimmy Smith (rugby league) (born 1971), Australian rugby league player

Others
 Jimmie Smith (Mississippi politician) (born 1952), mayor of Meridian, Mississippi
 Jimmie Todd Smith (born 1965),  Florida politician
 Jimmy Neil Smith (born 1945), American journalist

See also
 Jim Smith (disambiguation)
 James Smith (disambiguation)
 Jimmy Smyth (hurler) (1931–2013), Irish hurler